Oliver Katwesigye Koyekyenga (born on 14 November 1975) is a Ugandan businesswoman and legislator. As of April 2020, she is currently serving as the elected woman representative for Buhweju district in Uganda's tenth parliament. She represented the same constituency in Uganda's ninth parliament as a member of the National Resistance Movement. She then contested as an independent candidate in the 2016 general elections.

Background and education 
Oliver Katwesigye Koyekyenga achieved her O Levels (Uganda Certificate of Education) at Butare Senior Secondary School in 1995 before sitting for her A Levels (Uganda Advanced Certificate of Education) at the Lugogo Hall Centre in 2006. She also holds a bachelor's degree in International Business from Makerere University which she obtained in 2009.

Career 
Between 2007 and 2009, Oliver Katwesigye Koyekyenga worked as an Operations Manager at Coyetee then as a Customer Relations Manager at Hoopoe Tours and Travel, Kampala from 2009 to 2013.

Upon the death in 2013 of Joy Arinaitwe Kariisa, the then woman member of parliament for Buhweju District, Oliver Koyekyenga contested for the seat on the National Resistance Movement ticket achieving victory over Jane Frida Bwiruka.

She contested as an independent candidate in the 2016 general election to retain the seat. She sits on at least 2 Parliamentary committees.

References 

Living people
1975 births
Makerere University alumni
Members of the Parliament of Uganda
Women members of the Parliament of Uganda
National Resistance Movement politicians
21st-century Ugandan women politicians
21st-century Ugandan politicians